Jugni is an age-old narrative device used in Punjabi folk music. It is the traditional music of the Punjab region of the Indian subcontinent. Jugni is sung at Punjabi weddings in India, Pakistan, US, Canada, Australia and UK. In folk music, it stands in for the poet-writer who uses Jugni as an innocent observer to make incisive, often humorous, sometimes sad but always touching observations.

Description
In spiritual poetry Jugni means the spirit of life, or essence of life. Jugni is a style of singing that was first created by a famous Punjabi folk singer (late) Alam Lohar, who belonged to a small village in Punjab of British India, prior to the creation of Pakistan, Alam Lohar and after this singer, other singers have adopted this style.  Alam Lohar is also credited with popularizing this poetry from early Sufi spiritual writings and then subsequently later on it was transformed by other singers as a female girl just like prefixes like Preeto.

Alam Lohar started this genre of singing 'Jugni' during his early performances around pre-partition (1947), he sang Jugni throughout his early years of singing which was in the 1930s when he was a child star (started singing at a very young age) and many of his songs were not recorded at that time due to limited recording facilities within British India (pre-partition).
His LP record titled 'Jugni' was recorded later on in his career and became a gold disc LP in 1965.  
Alam Lohar has also recorded multiple variations of Jugni and some of this is still available to hear on many LP records and visible on black and white TV recordings even available on YouTube to view.  Other singers throughout the world have been greatly influenced by the Jugni recordings that Alam Lohar performed including his son Arif Lohar.

Much of early Jugni writing is spiritual in nature and relates to one's understanding of the world and one's relationship 
with God. Many poet philosophers have used the Jugni device, which is in the public domain, to make social, political or philosophical, often mildly subversive, commentary. ''Jugni invokes the name of God (often using the word "Saeen", the vernacular word for Lord).  A kernel of truth is an essential and integral part of every Jugni composition and there is a theory that Alam Lohar introduced and was influenced in relaying this term from reading old Sufi writings. 

Noting, Jugni is also an old Muslim worship tool, majorly named as TASBIH, a series of 21, 33, 51 or 101 pearls, which is used by SUFI SAINTS for practicing the holy words. Mainly it is made by white pearls and white thread and is known to be holy. Afterward, JUGNI has become an ornament for Punjabi Women.

The narrative style relies on Jugni landing up unexpectedly in diverse places and, wide-eyed, learning something new. Jugni makes her comments in three or four well written verses which may or may not rhyme but can always be sung in a rudimentary Punjabi folk style. The object could be a city, a state, a market place, a school, a religious place or a saloon, Jugni's non-malicious commentary catches the essence of the place and produces in the listener a chuckle and sometimes a lump in the throat. 
The Indian artist to make a mark was Asa Singh Mastana. Also Kuldeep Manak, born Latif Mohammad, has made notable Jugni contributions. Apart from that every other pop or folk singer from Harbhajan Mann, Arif Lohar, Gurdas Maan, Gurmeet Bawa to Rabbi Shergill has had his Jugni moment. Bollywood movie Oye Lucky, Lucky Oye has at least three songs that use the word Jugni. The song was sung by Des Raj Lachkani (basically a dadi singer), Lachkani is a village near Patiala, India.

In Pakistan, Jugni was popularized by the late folk music singer Alam Lohar. He received a gold disc LP for his Jugni in 1965. After that Saleem Javed and Arif Lohar, Alam Lohar's son, among others, have kept the tradition alive. Arif has brought in a more contemporary touch by incorporating modern vibes and rock influence in his versions of Jugni with Mukhtar Sahota (notably in his album "21st century Jugni"). In popular Pakistani culture Alamgir's Jugni is often the most-commonly recognized, which, in the mid-80's, encouraged young college students, most notably Saad Zahur, an architecture student at Lahore's NCA, who popularized the song with their own renditions. Arif Lohar has currently sang it for Coke Studio in Pakistan along with Meesha Shafi, a popular Pakistani youth, a version that will help this iconic song to further live on and on. This version of Jugni has crossed twenty-six (45) million views and is most popular Punjabi video on YouTube.

List of Jugni songs 
There are many variations of this song sung by many folk artists. Some of the more popular and notable names include the late Alam Lohar, Arif Lohar, Kuldeep Manak, Gurmeet Bawa, Asa Singh Mastana, and Surjeet Bindrakhia.

Jugni - various versions (late) Alam Lohar (1930's - 1979).
Jugni- Nouman Khalid featuring Bilal Saeed
Baba Sehgal - Jugni Mast Kalandar
Album Rabbi - By Rabbi Shregill
Ramta Di Jugni - Hazara Singh Ramta
Asa Singh Mastana (Album with Surinder Kaur)
Oye Lucky Lucky Oye - Bollywood Movie
Tanu Weds Manu (Lehmber Hussainpuri) - Bollywood Movie
Saheb Biwi Aur Gangster (BABBU MAAN SAAB) - Bollywood Movie
Alif Allah, Jugni (Coke Studio Season 3) -Arif Lohar and Meesha Shafi
Dr. Zeus and Kanika Kapoor - Jugni Ji Remix
Cocktail (Arif Lohar - Harshdeep Kaur) -(cocktail) Bollywood Movie
Saheb Biwi Aur Gangster Returns (Jazzy B) - Bollywood Movie
Highway - Bollywood Movie
Jugni - Alamgir (Pakistan pop) 1989
Jugni - Saleem Javed (Pakistan Pop) 1993 this version copied in Bollywood movie "Aflatoon" 'poster lagwado bazar may' by lalit sen shewta shetty
Azaad Group UK - Jugni (1990)
Jugni - A R Rahman - Tamil Movie(Kaatru Veliyidai)
Jugni - Tochi Raina (Sufi Acoustica)
Jugni 2.0 - Kanika Kapoor, Ft.  Mumzy Stranger, DJ Lyan Rose .
Jugni - Diljit Dosanjh & Diamond Platnumz.

See also
Folk music of Punjab

References

External links
 Jugni -(Informative Article)by Balraj Singh Sidhu Presented by Seema Grewal by BalrajSidhuUK | Balraj Sidhu UK
 Lekh: Jugni
 JUGNI....the punjabi soul - YouTube
 The Sunday Tribune - FOLK FOR FUTURE

Indian folk songs
Pakistani folk music
Punjabi words and phrases
Punjabi music